The following lists events that happened during 1911 in Australia.

Incumbents

 Monarch – George V
 Governor-General – William Ward, 2nd Earl of Dudley (until 31 July), then Thomas Denman, 3rd Baron Denman
 Prime Minister – Andrew Fisher
 Chief Justice – Samuel Griffith

State premiers
 Premier of New South Wales – James McGowen
 Premier of Queensland – William Kidston (until 7 February), then Digby Denham
 Premier of South Australia – John Verran
 Premier of Tasmania – Elliott Lewis
 Premier of Victoria – John Murray
 Premier of Western Australia – Frank Wilson (until 7 October), then John Scaddan

State governors
 Governor of New South Wales – Frederic Thesiger, 3rd Baron Chelmsford
 Governor of South Australia – Admiral Sir Day Bosanquet
 Governor of Queensland – Sir William MacGregor
 Governor of Tasmania – Major General Sir Harry Barron
 Governor of Western Australia – Sir Gerald Strickland
 Governor of Victoria – Sir Thomas Gibson-Carmichael

Events
The Australian Capital Territory is established through the Seat of Government (Administration) Act 1910.
1 January – The Northern Territory is politically separated from South Australia and transferred to Commonwealth control. The city of Palmerston is renamed Darwin in honour of Charles Darwin.
1 January – Compulsory military training comes into effect in Australia.
23 March – The steamer SS Yongala sinks in a cyclone off the coast of Townsville, Queensland killing 122 people.
3 April - 1911 Australian census was the first national population census. The day used for the census, was taken for the night between 2 and 3 April 1911. The total population of the Commonwealth of Australia was counted as 4,455,005. 
26 April – A federal referendum is held containing two questions: one on Trade and Commerce and the other on Nationalisation of Monopolies. Neither is carried.
30 May – The Supreme Court of the Northern Territory is established.
1 June – The University of Queensland opens.
10 July – King George V grants the title of Royal Australian Navy to Australia's naval forces.
27 June – The Royal Military College, Duntroon opens.
3 October – A state election is held in Western Australia. The Labor Party led by John Scaddan defeats the incumbent government of Frank Wilson.
2 December – The Australasian Antarctic Expedition, led by Douglas Mawson, leaves Hobart to begin an expedition to Antarctica.
The Commonwealth Bank of Australia is established by the Commonwealth Bank Act 1911.
18 December - The Marburg railway line opens in South west Queensland

Arts and literature

 The Austral Society ceased functioning.

Sport
16 September – The 1911 NSWRFL season culminates in a final re-play win to Eastern Suburbs, who defeated minor premiers Glebe 11 to 8.
30 September – Essendon become premiers of the 1911 VFL season, defeating Collingwood 5.11 (41) to 4.11 (35).
7 November – The Parisian wins the Melbourne Cup.

Births

January - March 

 7 January – Mervyn Waite, cricketer and Australian rules footballer (d. 1985)
 11 January – Nora Heysen, artist (d. 2003)
 13 January – Sir Joh Bjelke-Petersen, 31st Premier of Queensland (born in New Zealand) (d. 2005)
 21 January – Dick Garrard, Olympic wrestler (d. 2003)
 2 February – Jack Pizzey, 29th Premier of Queensland (d. 1968)
 16 February – Hal Porter, author and playwright (d. 1984)
 1 March – Ian Mudie, poet and author (d. 1976)
 12 March – Ainslie Roberts, painter, photographer, and artist (born in the United Kingdom) (d. 1993)
 18 March – Mick Cronin, Australian rules footballer and television commentator (d. 1979)
 30 March – Pat Galvin, South Australian politician (d. 1980)

April - June 

 1 April – Ray Maher, New South Wales politician (d. 1966)
 3 April – Sir Michael Woodruff, surgeon and scientist (born and died in the United Kingdom) (d. 2001)
 6 April – Herb Graham, 4th Deputy Premier of Western Australia (d. 1982)
 14 April – Sir Reginald Swartz, Queensland politician and soldier (d. 2006)
 22 April – Max Dupain, photographer (d. 1992)
 25 April – Leonard Long, artist (d. 2013)
 11 May – Malcolm Scott, Western Australian politician (d. 1989)
 12 May – Herbie Screaigh, Australian rules footballer (d. 2002)
 15 May – Nigel Drury, Queensland politician (d. 1984)
 24 May – Sir Archibald Glenn, industrialist and businessman (d. 2012)
 26 May – Sir Nigel Bowen, New South Wales politician and Federal Court Chief Justice (born in Canada) (d. 1994)
 29 May – George Szekeres, mathematician (born in Austria-Hungary) (d. 2005)
 4 June – Sir Alan Walker, theologian (d. 2003)
 8 June – Ralph Green, Australian rules footballer (Carlton) (d. 1991)
 10 June – Chilla Christ, cricketer (d. 1998)
 21 June – Chester Wilmot, war correspondent (d. 1954)

July - September 

 4 July – Bruce Hamilton, public servant (d. 1989)
 5 July – Haydn Bunton Sr., Australian rules footballer (Fitzroy) (d. 1955)
 7 July – Sir Keith Jones, surgeon (d. 2012)
 11 July – Olive Cotton, photographer (d. 2003)
 17 July – Bertie Milliner, Queensland politician (d. 1975)
 23 July – Ian Dougald McLachlan, military officer (d. 1991)
 27 July – Percy Beames, Australian rules footballer (Melbourne) and cricketer (d. 2004)
 27 August – Bluey Wilkinson, speedway rider (d. 1940)
 30 August – Ted Harris, Queensland politician (d. 1993)
 9 September – Sir John Gorton, 19th Prime Minister of Australia (born in New Zealand) (d. 2002)
 16 September – Wilfred Burchett, journalist (d. 1983)
 21 September – Afferbeck Lauder, author (d. 1998)
 22 September – George Bennett, Australian rules footballer (Footscray, Hawthorn) (d. 1974)
 29 September – Sir Charles Court, 21st Premier of Western Australia (born in the United Kingdom) (d. 2007)

October - December 

 4 October – Ray Whittorn, Victorian politician (d. 1995)
 12 October – John England, New South Wales politician and Administrator of the Northern Territory (d. 1985)
 14 October – Sir Marcus Loane, Anglican Archbishop of Sydney and Primate of Australia (d. 2009)
 21 October – Dick Harris, Australian rules footballer (Richmond) (d. 1993)
 26 October – John Hinde, broadcaster and film reviewer (d. 2006)
 1 November – Samuel Warren Carey, geologist (d. 2002)
 8 November – Sir Robert Jackson, public servant and United Nations administrator (d. 1991)
 11 November – Bill Longley, speedway racer (d. 2005)
 3 December – Bill Cahill, Australian rules footballer (Essendon) (d. 1966)
 31 December – Dal Stivens, writer (d. 1997)

Deaths

 4 February – George Edwards, New South Wales politician (b. 1855)
 18 February – Billy Murdoch, cricketer (b. 1854)
 4 March – William Randell, South Australian politician and pioneer (born in the United Kingdom) (b. 1824)
 8 March – John Neild, New South Wales politician (born in the United Kingdom) (b. 1846)
 18 March – Sir Richard Baker, South Australian politician (b. 1842)
 6 May – Thomas Edward Spencer, writer (born in the United Kingdom) (b. 1845)
 9 July – Douglas Fry, artist (born in the United Kingdom) (b. 1872)
 13 July – Allan McLean, 19th Premier of Victoria (b. 1840)
 16 August – Francis Moran, Cardinal Archbishop of Sydney (born in Ireland) (b. 1830)
 21 August – George Sydney Aldridge, businessman (born in the United Kingdom) (b. 1847)
 13 September – James Rutherford, transit pioneer (born in the United States) (b. 1827)
 23 September – John Arthur Barry, journalist and author (born in the United Kingdom) (b. 1850)
 29 September – Lord Northcote, 3rd Governor-General of Australia (born and died in the United Kingdom) (b. 1846)
 3 October – Rosetta Jane Birks, suffragist (b. 1856)
 5 October – William Astley, short story writer (born in the United Kingdom) (b. 1855)
 6 October – Sir John Hoad, 4th Chief of the General Staff (b. 1856)
 8 October – Lee Batchelor, South Australian politician (b. 1865)
 15 October – Norman Selfe, civil engineer (born in the United Kingdom) (b. 1839)

See also
 List of Australian films of the 1910s

References

 
Australia
Years of the 20th century in Australia